Iana Boukova (born 18 July 1968) is a Bulgarian poet, novelist and essayist. Considered one of the most significant Bulgarian authors of the 21st century.

Life

Born in Sofia in 1968, Boukova has a degree in Classics from Sofia University. She is the author of three books of poetry, including Diocletian’s Palaces (1995), Boat in the Eye (2000), and Notes of the Phantom Woman (2018); two collections of short stories, including A as in Аnything (2006) and Tales With No Return (2016); and the novel Traveling in the Direction of the Shadow (first published in 2009, followed by a revised edition in 2014). 
Her poems and short stories have been translated into numerous languages, including Greek, Spanish, French, German, and Arabic. English translations of her poetry and prose have been published in various anthologies and journals in the US
and the UK, including Best European Fiction 2017, Words Without Borders, Two Lines, Absinthe, Drunken Boat, Ariel Art, European Literature Network, Zoland Poetry, Take Five, At the End of the World – Contemporary Poetry from Bulgaria. 

Boukova is a member of the platform Greek Poetry Now and of the editorial board of FRMK, a biannual journal on poetry,  poetics, and visual arts. Poems originally written by her in Greek were included in Austerity Measures: The New Greek Poetry (Penguin Books, 2016, New York Review of Books, 2017). Books in Greek: The minimal garden, Ikaros 2006 (translated by Dimitris Allos), Drapetomania, Mikri Arktos 2018. Boukova is also the editor and translator into Bulgarian of more than ten collections and anthologies of modern and ancient Greek poetry, including Sappho’s Fragments (The Union of Bulgarian Translators’ Prize in 2010), the collected poetry of Catullus, and the Pythian Odes by Pindar (The National Prize for Translation in 2011).

According to the Bulgarian poet and writer Silvia Choleva "Boukova is a Borgesian type of author. She favors play, references, riddles unexpected twists, ironies, and the dramaturgy of verse. She possesses deep knowledge not just in the sphere of the humanities, in which she specialized, but she is also enticed by science, she knows a lot, and all of this is reflected in Notes of the Phantom Woman"

Fiction
Iana Boukova is the author of the short story collections A as in Аnything (2006) and Tales With No Return (2016), and the novel Traveling in the Direction of the Shadow. Her novel was originally published in Bulgarian in 2009 (followed by a revised edition in 2014). Traveling in the Direction of the Shadow has been praised as one of the most innovative, compelling, erudite, idiosyncratic, and ambitious books to emerge out of the contemporary Bulgarian literary scene for decades past. This very Borgesian novel is a story about storytelling—about stories’ power to mutually attract, to find their path towards each other, and to complete one another. The main characters, whose names serve as titles of the novel’s eight chapters, all have their own complete, cradle-to-grave “biography,” their own hidden, often torturous talent; they have all been marked by fate in their own way. Intellectually, stylistically, and conceptually, Boukova is in conversation with a global community of authors, brought together by translation and including, in particular, Jorge Luis Borges as well as Marguerite Yourcenar, Milorad Pavić, Gabriel García Márquez, Italo Calvino, or Georges Perec, among others.

According to the PEN America  Pen/Heim Translation fund grants Jury Iana Boukova’s novel Traveling in the Direction of the Shadow is one of the most original and compelling books to emerge out of Bulgaria’s contemporary literary scene: the plot, unfolding during the 19th century in and around the Balkans, offers complex insights and historical perspectives on cultures that are little known beyond their borders, and the main characters, whose names serve as titles of the novel’s eight chapters, each have their own intriguing cradle-to-grave biographies. In her masterful translation, Ekaterina Petrova has captured the many nuances, registers, and literary devices of Iana Boukova’s prose."

Poetry 
Her poetry collection Notes of the Phantom Woman received the Ivan Nikolov National Award for the most outstanding book of poetry in 2019. A Greek-language version of it was also published in 2018 in Athens under the title Drapetomania. 

The Greek poet, artist, and translator Katerina Iliopoulou defines that: The Phantom-woman orchestrating the book is the invisibly present witness-poet, the one who has been turned into a ghost across the entire spectrum of the totalitarianism of merchandise, disguised as a cartoon-like superhero, showcasing the incredible transforming powers of poetry. Because the poetry at hand is not one of defeat but, rather, battle-ready poetry, the poetry of the present coming-to-be, which declares: we' re perfectly able to use your own weapons!. The Athens daily morning newspaper Kathimerini underlines the significance of Iana Boukova's poetry: A pointed intellect is in charge: a restless, ironic intelligence is given utterance in a style that’s meant to smart, to cause abrasions, unburdened by the delusion of prophetic speech and the concomitant assurance of high discourse. The Greek poet, and critic Orfeas Apergis emphasizes in the newspaper Ta Nea that: This book brings in contact the essay form (the philosophic, metaphysical “tendency”) and poetry (poetic excess), like two ever-moving, rotating grindstones that hone one another. Boukova formulates conclusions that appear scientific yet bear a poetic charge, one usually expressed in terms of terror at the metaphysical void. The book’s second central section is titled “Tractatus”. It is a treatise on the revulsion an observer feels towards city pigeons. Like Wittgenstein meeting Kafka, you might say. This Tractatus could well be taught at schools as an example of the difference between poetry and “poeticality”."

Works

Books
Notes of the Phantom Woman: Poetry. Plovdiv: Janet 45, 2018, 67 p. 
К като всичко: Stories. Plovdiv: Janet 45, 2018, 2. еа., 120 p. 
Drapetomania: Poetry. Athens: Mikri Arktos, 2018, 64 p. 
 A as in anything: Stories. Sofia: Prozoretz, 2016, 64 p. 
4 Tales With no Return: Разкази. Plovdiv: Janet 45, 2011, 44 p. 
Traveling in the Direction of Shadow. Novel. Second revised edition Plovdiv: Janet 45, 2014, 2. ed., 311 p. 
Traveling in the Direction of Shadow. Novel.  First edition. Sofia: Stigmata, 2009, 312 p. 
К като всичко: Stories. Sofia: Stigmata, 2006, 103 p. 
The Minimal Garden: Poetry. Athens: Ikaros Books, 2006, 56 p. 
Boat in the Eye: Poetry. Sofia: Heron Press, 2000, 45 p. 
Diocletian Palaces: Poetry. Sofia: Svobodno poet. obshtestvo, 1995, 39 p.

Works in anthologies and literary collections

Boukova, Iana. (2018). The Stone Quarter [Fiction]. In: Absinthe. World Literature in Translation: Hellenisms. Michigan: Michigan Publishing Services 2018, pp. 65–78. 
Boukova, Iana. (2017). The Teacher Came Back Drunk [Fiction]. In: Best European Fiction 2017, by Nathaniel Davis (Editor), Eileen Battersby (Preface), Champaign, Illinois. 
Boukova, Iana. (2017). Ausgewaehlte Gedichte [Poetry]. In: Kleine Tiere zum Schlachten: Neue Gedichte aus Griechenland, von Adrian Kasnitz (Herausgeber, Uebersetzer), Köln. 
Boukova, Iana. (2016). A as in Anything [Fiction]. In: Two Lines 25, Fall 2016. San Francisco, California in 2016. 
Boukova, Iana. (2016). - The Minimal Garden, - Black Haiku, - For Miltos Sachtouris, - Fractal [Poetry]. In: Austerity Measures: The New Greek Poetry, by Van Dyck, Karen (Editor), New York: Penguin UK; Bilingual edition. 
Boukova, Iana. (2013). Poems [Poetry]. In: Voix de la Mediterranee: Anthologie poetique 2013. Venissieux, Lyon, 2013, 123 p., 
Boukova, Iana. (2012). - The Poet, All in White, - The Dusseldorf Match Plantations, - Apology on Monday Lunchtime [Poetry]. In: At the End of the World. Contemporary Poetry from Bulgaria. Bristol: Shearsman Books 2013, pp. 82–89. 
Boukova, Iana. (2008). Les Pommes [Fiction]. In: Concertos pour phrase: 17 nouvelles contemporaines de Bulgarie. Paris: HB Editions, 2008, 210 p.. 
Boukova, Iana. (2007). Thirteen poems [Poetry]. In: Take Five 07, Shoestring Press, Nottingham 2007, Iana Boukova p.p. 29-41. Translated by Jonathan Dunne 
Boukova, Iana. (2007). - A Short Poem about the Evening and Music, - Self-Portrait on a Background of Begonias, - Balkan Naive Painters [Poetry]. In: Karaoke poetry bar, Futura, Athens 2007, pp. 58–62.

Selected literary translations
Sappho. (2019). 100+1 Fragments preface and translation into bulgarian by Iana Boukova. Sofia : Poetry publishing house DA, 2019, 159 p. 
Pindar. (2011). Pythian Odes preface and translation into bulgarian by Iana Boukova. Sofia : Stigmata, 2011, 176 p. 
Sappho. (2010). 100+1 Fragments preface and translation into bulgarian by Iana Boukova. Sofia : Stigmata, 2010, 159 p. 
Gaius Valerius Catullus. (2009). Poetry preface and translation into bulgarian by Iana Boukova. Sofia : Stigmata, 2009, 176 p.

References

External links
 
 Iana Boukova on Biblionet
 Iana Boukova on Janet 45
 Iana Boukova, or The Relentless Search for Meaning(s). Ekaterina Petrova on Iana Boukova in Asymptote Journal
 Excerpt from Traveling in the Direction of the Shadow in the European Literature Network
 Excerpt from Traveling in the Direction of the shadow in Words without borders 
 The short story Stone Quarter in Absinthe 
 Three poems in ArielArt 

1968 births
Living people
Writers from Sofia
21st-century Bulgarian women writers